René Honorato Cienfuegos was a Chilean doctor and researcher, professor of Experimental Medicine at the University of Chile. He was a recipient of the Guggenheim Grant in 1946.

Works 

 Estudio sobre insulina resistente a los jugos digestivos, 1946

References

Year of birth missing
Year of death missing
20th-century Chilean physicians